The Rivian EDV (electric delivery van) is a battery-electric cargo vehicle built by Rivian exclusively for its investor Amazon, which will use the EDV for package delivery. The EDV uses the RCV (Rivian Commercial Vehicle) platform, which is derived from the R1 platform that underpins the manufacturer's R1T pickup truck and R1S sport-utility vehicles, and is built in three sizes. Specific models (ordered by increasing size) include the EDV-500, EDV-700, and EDV-900.

History
In February 2019, Amazon announced it was leading a $700 million investment in Rivian. That September, Amazon Logistics ordered 100,000 battery electric delivery vehicles as part of a collaborative design effort between Rivian and Amazon. Initial schedules stated the first vans would be delivered to Amazon in 2021, with as many as 10,000 electric vans in operation by 2022, and the full order to be fulfilled by 2024. However, that date was later revised to 2030. The Rivian collaboration is part of Amazon's plan to convert its delivery fleet to 100% renewable energy by 2030. Amazon also will source electric vans and three-wheelers from other OEMs, such as Stellantis, Mercedes-Benz Group, and Mahindra.

By February 2020, Rivian had shown a full-size clay model of the van. A prototype Amazon electric delivery van with  range was tested on public roads in early 2021, starting in Los Angeles and San Francisco. By April 2021, testing had expanded to Denver with additional plans to test in sixteen more U.S. cities in different climate zones. Tests in Oklahoma and Michigan were underway by July 2021. The first production EDV, an EDV-700, was completed in December 2021 and delivered to Amazon.

Deployment of the electric delivery vans began in nine U.S. cities in July 2022. By November, Amazon stated it had more than 1,000 EDVs in operation which had delivered a collective 5 million packages. It is expected, based on the presence of a non-Amazon trim code, that Rivian will market the van to fleet owners in the future.

Specifications

Each size will share the same stand-up interior height, but the smallest model will be narrower than the others. All of the vans will be built on the same platform—basic electrical and network architecture, ECUs, and battery-pack design—as the Rivian R1 models, and will use a basic single-motor e-axle drive unit. The van is to be produced exclusively for Amazon, and will be built with a steel chassis on a "low-feature-content" assembly line to keep costs down. The van is explicitly designed to allow Amazon to reduce costs and shrink its carbon footprint.

Platform and drivetrain
The RCV platform uses a typical electric vehicle skateboard-type chassis with double wishbone front suspension and a twist beam trailing arm rear suspension on a steel ladder frame. The coil-sprung rear axle uses a track bar for lateral support, while the front suspension uses a transverse composite leaf spring.

According to a vehicle identification number encoding document that Rivian filed with the NHTSA, there will be three drivetrain options: front-wheel drive using one or two traction motors, or all-wheel drive with two motors. The first EDV-700s have a single-motor front-wheel drive arrangement.

The high-voltage traction battery is carried beneath the body floor. Initially, only one traction battery size will be manufactured. The EDV-900, which has the largest cargo volume, is expected to receive a smaller battery; because Amazon typically delivers bulky yet relatively light packages, the largest vans most likely will operate in dense neighborhoods, which would not require a very long range. Charging speeds of up to 150 kW are possible.

Because the EDV-500 will be used in Europe, it has a narrower width than the -700, and the -500 also is available in a right-hand drive version. Externally, the different sizes can be distinguished by counting the number of "segments" behind the side doors: the EDV-500 has three, the -700 has four, and the -900 has five.

Safety
To aid the driver's vision, the van is equipped with an enlarged windshield and stitched exterior cameras that are used to display a view of the entire surroundings. For visibility to other motorists, the rear sides and roof of the van are outlined with a large red taillight. Warning noises were developed through testing in Seattle that ensured the vans would be audible to pedestrians outdoors but not people inside buildings. The EDV also is equipped with radar which along with the cameras enables advanced driver-assistance systems including forward collision warning, automatic emergency braking, and lane-keeping assistance.

The curb-side door is a sliding door, while the street-side door for the driver is a conventional forward-hinged door, which provides better side impact resistance. The rear cargo area is accessed either through an exterior roll-up door or an interior sliding door separating the cargo area from the driver's compartment; input from Amazon delivery partners resulted in non-slip steps integrated into the rear bumper and handgrips to aid access.

Styling
The front of the vehicle was deliberately styled to be friendly and appealing, featuring circular headlights surrounded by semi-circular rings that act as daytime running lights or turn indicators; Jason Torchinsky wrote the EDV "looks friendly and eager, like a whale who's here to help."

The EDV is equipped with large touchscreens and navigation software to aid the driver on their route.

References

External links
 , CNBC video
  
  

EDV
Production electric cars
Vans
Electric vans
Commercial vehicles
Rivian trucks and vans
Amazon (company)